Coventry Hills is a suburban residential neighbourhood in the northeast quadrant of Calgary, Alberta. It is at the northern edge of the city and is bounded by Stoney Trail to the north, Deerfoot Trail and the Nose Creek to the east, Country Hills Boulevard to the south, and Harvest Hills Boulevard to the west. 

Coventry Hills was established as a neighbourhood in 1991. It is represented in the Calgary City Council by the Ward 3 councillor.

Demographics

Residents in this community had a median household income of $70,096 in 2000, and there were 6% low income residents living in the neighbourhood. As of 2000, 12.9% of the residents were immigrants. All buildings were single-family detached homes, and 3.9% of the housing was used for renting.

Education
Coventry Hills has two public schools, Coventry Hills Elementary School (K-3) and Nose Creek School (4-9), and two separate schools, St. Clare Catholic Elementary School (K-6), Northern Lights School (K-5) and Notre Dame Catholic High School (10-12) which is located nearby in Country Hills Village.

There is a high school currently being built in the community, North Calgary High School will be the newest school in the community and is located at the current Coventry Hills Park in the NW corner of the community near Harvest Hills Blvd. 80% of the construction is complete.

See also
List of neighbourhoods in Calgary

References

External links
Northern Hills (Cinnamon Hills - Country Hills - Coventry Hills - Harvest Hills - Panorama Hills Community Association
Northern Hills Community Association - Dedicated to providing community sports programs such as soccer, schools, events, recreation, Planning and Development projects, community enhancement, and much more.

Neighbourhoods in Calgary